

This is a list of the National Register of Historic Places listings in York County, South Carolina.

This is intended to be a complete list of the properties and districts on the National Register of Historic Places in York County, South Carolina, United States. The locations of National Register properties and districts for which the latitude and longitude coordinates are included below, may be seen on a map.

There are 59 properties and districts listed on the National Register in the county. The city of Rock Hill is the location of 28 of these properties and districts; they are listed separately, while the 31 properties and districts in the remaining parts of the county are listed here.

Current listings

|}

See also

List of National Historic Landmarks in South Carolina
National Register of Historic Places listings in South Carolina

References

 
York County